1950–51 was the fifth season of the Western International Hockey League.

Standings

 Spokane Flyers		39-21-2	.645	319-246
 Trail Smoke Eaters	26-16-4	.609	205-170
 Kimberley Dynamiters	20-21-1	.488	198-213
 Nelson Maple Leafs	15-30-1	.337	155-238

Played interlocking with the Okanagan Mainline League.

League Championship final

Best of 5

 Trail 5 Spokane 3
 Spokane 6 Trail 4
 Trail 5 Spokane 4
 Trail 7 Spokane 2

Trail Smoke Eaters beat Spokane Flyers 3 wins to 1.

Note: Spokane Flyers were not eligible for the Allan Cup.

Semi final

Best of 5

 Kimberley 9 Nelson 2
 Nelson 2 Kimberley 1
 Kimberley 3 Nelson 1
 Kimberley 8 Nelson 5

Kimberley Dynamiters beat Nelson Maple Leafs 3 wins to 1.

Final

Best of 5

 Trail 6 Kimberley 1
 Trail 8 Kimberley 2
 Kimberley 8 Trail 3
 Kimberley 4 Trail 3
 Trail 5 Kimberley 3

Trail Smoke Eaters beat Kimberley Dynamiters 3 wins to 2.

Trail Smoke Eaters advanced to the 1950-51 British Columbia Senior Playoffs.

References 

\

Western International Hockey League seasons
Wihl
Wihl